Daechi Station is a station on the Seoul Subway Line 3. It is located in Daechi-dong, Gangnam-gu, Seoul. It was named after a former village in the area, Hanti (한티), as Daechi is the Chinese reading of the hanja. The name of the station is Chinese characters, meaning "big hill."

Station layout

Vicinity
Exit 1 : Cheongsil APT
Exit 2 : Kukje APT
Exit 3 :
Exit 4 : Eunma APT
Exit 5 : Daegok Elementary School, Mido APT
Exit 6 :
Exit 7 : Daechi Elementary School
Exit 8 :

References 

Seoul Metropolitan Subway stations
Metro stations in Gangnam District
Railway stations opened in 1993
Seoul Subway Line 3